Nedanovce is a village and municipality in Partizánske District in the Trenčín Region of western Slovakia.

History
In historical records the village was first mentioned in 1344.

Geography
The municipality lies at an altitude of 180 metres and covers an area of 7 km². It has a population of about 615 people.

References

External links

http://www.statistics.sk/mosmis/eng/run.html

Villages and municipalities in Partizánske District